Robert Williamson Steele (January 14, 1820 – February 7, 1901) was governor of the extralegal Territory of Jefferson, which existed in the western United States from 1859 to 1861, when it was replaced by the Territory of Colorado.

Early life
Steele was born near Chillicothe in Ross County, Ohio. He farmed until 1846, when he began the study of law at Fairfield, Iowa. In 1848 he married Susan Nevin at Hillsboro, Ohio, and graduated from the Law School of Cincinnati four years later. In 1855, Steele moved to Omaha, settling in Douglas County of the Nebraska Territory. He was elected as a Democrat to the Nebraska Territorial House of Representatives to represent Douglas County in 1857.

The following year, news reached Omaha of gold discovered along the South Platte River.  On March 25, 1859, Steele set out for the gold fields with his wife Susan and four children in an ox-drawn prairie schooner. They arrived at Denver City in May. Steele soon moved to Central City, where he prospected for gold. He also served as president of the Consolidated Ditch Company. Steele built a log cabin on the Ute Trail midway between Denver City and Central City; he named the spot Mount Vernon in honor of George Washington.

Territorial Governor
On September 29, 1859, Steele was nominated for Governor of the proposed Territory of Jefferson. On October 24, 1859 the formation of a provisional government was approved and Steele defeated J.H. St. Matthew for Governor.

Governor Steele opened the first session of the provisional territorial legislature on November 7, 1859, with a proclamation:

Steele called for the next session to meet on January 23, 1860.

Also in 1860, he formed the Apex and Gregory Wagon Road Company to build a toll road from  Denver City to the gold fields at Gregory Gulch. It was later renamed the Denver City, Mt. Vernon, and Gregory Toll Road. When Steeles' home accidentally burned, the family rebuilt at Apex, on the toll road.

Governor Steele attempted to deal with the officials of the Kansas Territory, which was still the recognized government over the region. On August 7, 1860, Steele requested the Provisional Government of the Jefferson Territory be merged into the Kansas Territory.  However, Kansas officials refused to agree and the stalemate continued.

The end of the Territory of Jefferson
On November 6, 1860, Abraham Lincoln won the U.S. presidential election, which precipitated the secession of seven slave states and the formation of the Confederate States of America. This ended any chance for federal endorsement of the Territory of Jefferson. Furthermore, as a staunch pro-Union Democrat and vocal opponent of both Lincoln and the Republican Party, R.W. Steele also became a pariah.

On January 26, 1861, the United States Congress passed a bill organizing the Territory of Colorado. It was signed into law by U.S. President James Buchanan two days later on January 28, 1861. On June 6, 1861, Governor Steele issued a proclamation disbanding the Territory of Jefferson and urging all residents to abide by the laws governing the United States.

Later years
In 1862, Steele moved to Gilpin County, Colorado; in 1863 he moved again, first to Empire and then to Georgetown. In 1865, he reluctantly returned to Iowa. Just two years later, he returned to Georgetown. The one-time governor spent his last years in Colorado Springs, where he died on February 7, 1901, almost a month after his 81st birthday. He is buried in Evergreen Cemetery in Colorado Springs.

Legacy
Steele has been called the Father of Colorado for his tireless efforts to develop the then frontier region. His 1867 home survives and is on the National Register of Historic Places.

See also

History of Colorado
List of governors of Colorado
Pike's Peak Gold Rush
Territory of Jefferson
List of governors of dependent territories in the 19th century

References

External links
 Territorial Town
 
 Health Care Heritage

1820 births
1901 deaths
Colorado Mining Boom
Colorado Democrats
People from Jefferson County, Colorado
Governors of Jefferson Territory
Members of the Nebraska Territorial Legislature
19th-century American politicians
Nebraska Democrats
Politicians from Chillicothe, Ohio
Politicians from Omaha, Nebraska